Hypodematium is a genus of ferns.

Species
Hypodematium crenatum (Forssk.) Kuhn
Hypodematium daochengense K. H. Shing
Hypodematium fordii (Bak.) Ching
Hypodematium glabrius (Copel.) Holtt.
Hypodematium glabrum Ching ex Shing
Hypodematium glandulosum Ching ex Shing
Hypodematium glanduloso-pilosum (Tagawa) Ohwi
Hypodematium gracile Ching
Hypodematium microlepioides Ching ex Shing
Hypodematium phegopteroideum Kuhn
Hypodematium sinense Iwatsuki
Hypodematium squamuloso-pilosum Ching
Hypodematium taiwanensis Ching ex Shing

Hypodematium is the type genus of the family Hypodematiaceae.

References

World species list for Hypodematium: http://homepages.caverock.net.nz/~bj/fern/hypodematium.htm

Polypodiales
Fern genera